Nigel Isaacs (born 26 December 1971 in Colombo, Sri Lanka) is a former Canadian cricketer. He was a left-handed batsman and a right-arm off-break bowler. He played one List A match for Canada at the 1998 Commonwealth Games. He also represented them at two ICC Trophy tournaments.

He is a native of Sri Lanka and was educated at St. Joseph's College, Colombo, Sri Lanka.

References
Cricket Archive profile

1971 births
Living people
Canadian cricketers
Commonwealth Games competitors for Canada
Cricketers at the 1998 Commonwealth Games
Sri Lankan emigrants to Canada